Denby is a surname. Notable people with the surname include:

Charles Denby (disambiguation), several people including:
Charles Harvey Denby (1830–1904), U.S. Civil War officer, diplomat in China
Charles Denby Jr. (1861–1938), U.S. diplomat, scholar of Chinese culture
Cindy Denby (born 1955), American politician
David Denby (academic), Irish academic, senior lecturer in French
David Denby (born 1943), U.S. journalist, film critic for The New Yorker
Edwin Denby (disambiguation), several people including:
Edwin Denby (poet) (1903–1983), U.S. poet, novelist, dance critic
Edwin Denby (politician) (1870–1929), U.S. politician, Secretary of Navy, noted in the Teapot Dome Scandal
James Denby (1892–1977), English footballer
Joolz Denby (born 1955), British poet and novelist
Kara Denby (born 1986), U.S. swimmer
Sam Denby (born 1998), U.S. YouTuber